Anthony or Tony Banks may refer to:

Tony Banks (musician) (born 1950), English musician from the band Genesis
Tony Banks, Baron Stratford (1942–2006), British Labour Party politician, Member of Parliament for West Ham
Tony Banks (American football) (born 1973), American National Football League (NFL) quarterback
Ant Banks (born 1969), American music producer and rapper
Tony Banks (businessman) (born 1961), Falklands War veteran and businessman